Landmark 81 is a supertall skyscraper in Ho Chi Minh City, Vietnam. The investor and primary developer for the project is Vinhomes, a Vietnamese corporation that is also the country's largest real-estate company. Landmark 81 is the tallest building in Vietnam, the second tallest building in Southeast Asia, and the 17th tallest building in the world.

The tower is at the heart of the $1.5 billion high-end mixed-use urban area called Vinhomes Central Park. The development comprises hotel and conference facilities, luxury apartments, high-end retail spaces including Armani Exhange and Rolex, restaurants, bars, and a multi-story observation deck.

History

The ground-breaking ceremony for the tower was held on 13 December 2014. By January 2018, construction had finished on all floors, with only the spire and crown remaining to be built. On 10 April 2018, the last segment of the crown spire was added, architecturally completing Landmark 81. The observation deck, named Skyview, opened on 28 April 2019. Ticket ranges from 405,000 VND (17.4 USD) for children to 810,000 VND (US$34.8) for adults.

Floor plan
The following is a breakdown of floors.

Fire
At around 15:48 on 11 August 2018, a fire occurred on the 64th floor caused by welding activities. The fire was quickly controlled and did not cause any damage to the property.

Gallery

See also
Bitexco Financial Tower
List of tallest buildings in Vietnam
List of tallest buildings
List of tallest buildings in Southeast Asia

References

Skyscrapers in Ho Chi Minh City
Skyscraper office buildings in Vietnam
Skyscraper hotels
Residential skyscrapers
2018 establishments in Asia
Vingroup
Office buildings completed in 2018
Residential buildings completed in 2018
Hotel buildings completed in 2018